Anna Bilotti (born 15 June 1982) is an Italian politician. She is a member of the Chamber of Deputies from Campania 2 for the Five Star Movement.

References 

Living people
1982 births
21st-century Italian women politicians
Deputies of Legislature XVIII of Italy
Five Star Movement politicians
Women members of the Chamber of Deputies (Italy)